John Henry McCray (1910–1987) was an African American journalist, newspaper publisher, politician, civil rights activist, and college academic administrator.

He worked at some of the country's most prominent Black newspapers including the Lighthouse and Informer newspaper of South Carolina (from 1941 to 1954); the Charleston Messenger; the Pittsburgh Courier as the Carolina editor (from 1960 to 1962); the Baltimore Afro-American (from 1954 to 1960); The Chicago Defender (from 1962 to 1963); and the Atlanta Daily World (from February to September 1964). McCray was a co-founder of the Progressive Democratic Party (PDP) of South Carolina.

Early life and education 
John Henry McCray was born on August 25, 1910, in Youngstown, Florida, to parents Rachel Rebecca Montgomery and Donald Carlos McCray. He grew up in Lincolnville, near Charleston.

He attended high school at Avery Institute (or Avery Normal Institute) in Charleston, where he was valedictorian. He earned his B.S. degree in chemistry in 1935 at Talladega College.

Career 
He started his career at North Carolina Mutual Life Insurance Company, the largest Black-owned life insurance company. From 1935 to 1938, he was working as a city editor of the Charleston Messenger. From 1939 to 1941, he stated his own newspaper Charleston Lighthouse (later known as Carolina Lighthouse), followed by taking over Reverend E. A. Parker's People's Informer.

On December 7, 1941, McCray published the first edition of the Black weekly newspaper, Lighthouse and Informer. The Lighthouse and Informer, was a progressive publication which called for racial equality, and rejected any racial accommodation, and incrementalism. The articles covered many aspect of Black life and columns. The last publication of the Lighthouse and Informer was June 12, 1954.

In 1944, he was cofounder of the Progressive Democratic Party (PDP) of South Carolina. The PDP was the first Black Democratic Party in the Southern United States.

In September 1964, McCray become director of public relations at his alma mater, Talladega College, where he eventually retired from in 1981, then as the director of recruitment and admissions.

Death and legacy 
McCray died on September 15, 1987, in Sylacauga, Alabama.

The library at the University of South Carolina holds the John Henry McCray Papers. McCray is part of a mural, The Pursuit of Opportunity: Celebrating African American Business, by artist Ija Charles, located at 1401 Main Street in Columbia, South Carolina. Additionally there is a historical marker located in Columbia, dedicated to McCray and the Lighthouse and Informer.

McCray is included in Sid Bedingfield's book, Newspaper Wars: Civil Rights and White Resistance in South Carolina, 1935–1965 (published in 2017).

In 2020, the National Park Service gave a three-year grant to Allen University located in Columbia to study McCray.

References

External links 
 John Henry McCray Papers, 1929–1989, South Caroliniana Library, University of South Carolina

1910 births
1987 deaths
Talladega College alumni
Talladega College staff
African-American press
African-American journalists
People from Charleston, South Carolina
African-American people in South Carolina politics
20th-century African-American people